Thailand Creative & Design Center (TCDC) is a public resource center in Thailand focused on the design and creative industries. It was founded in 2004 as part of the Office of Knowledge Management and Development, a government-owned public organization, and opened on 14 November 2005. Its oversight was transferred to the newly created Creative Economy Agency (Public Organization) in 2018.

The main objective of TCDC is to facilitate access to knowledge for Thai residents, as well as inspiring Thai people to be creative through workshops, activities and inspirations from the successful designers worldwide. TCDC also focuses on working with Thai SME start-ups and designers, mainly by creating awareness of the value of creative businesses and designs. At the same time, TCDC also helps promote Thai designers on the international market.

TCDC's headquarters, and its resource center, is located in the Grand Postal Building in Bangrak District, Bangkok. Its branches include Emporium (in co-operation with AIS under the name of AIS.D.C.) and Ideo-Q Samyan. TCDC also has regional centers in Chiang Mai and Khon Kaen.

References

Educational organizations based in Thailand
Libraries in Thailand
Public organizations of Thailand